Sticker Happy is the fifth studio album of the Filipino rock band Eraserheads. It was released under BMG Records (Pilipinas) Inc. on September 11, 1997. Produced by longtime collaborator Robin Rivera, the album contains eighteen tracks with a 67-minute runtime. The album cover generated controversy due to its content, which features a nude woman playing a piano while holding a red balloon in an open grass field. The woman was later revealed to be Filipino-Iranian television personality Joey Mead King.

While still retaining their classic alternative rock sound, the band infused elements from techno and experimental rock music, leading to sonically different and expansive themes compared to their previous efforts. Additionally, the band had taken a different approach to their composition, incorporating a wider range of instruments, guitar effects, and cryptic lyrics.

Sticker Happy was moderately successful in the Philippines, it has sold 55,000 copies nationwide. The album received a platinum certification from the Philippine Association of the Record Industry (PARI).

Track listing

Personnel
Ely Buendia – lead vocals (tracks 1–5, 7–9, 11–12, 14–16), rhythm guitar, acoustic guitar (track 16)
Buddy Zabala – bass guitar, backing vocals, piano (track 16), lead vocals (track 1), spoken word outro (track 18)
Marcus Adoro – lead guitar, backing vocals, acoustic guitar (track 16), lead vocals (tracks 1)
Raimund Marasigan – drums, lead vocals (tracks 1, 6, 10, 13, 17), percussion, backing vocals

Additional personnel

Robin Rivera – producer, mastering
Angee Rozul – mixer, recording
Eric Lava – mixer, recording, mastering
Dindo Aldecoa – recording
Binary Soup (Dino Ignacio) – layout, design
Francis Reyes – art direction
Ogrudek (John Tronco) – photography
Joey Mead King – cover model

Reception

David Gonzales of AllMusic gave Sticker Happy three out of five stars and wrote that "While the album is not as enjoyable nor the melodies as uniformly strong as on Cutterpillow, which remains the band's best album, Sticker Happy has its fine moments."

In popular culture
An urban legend popular among fans alleges that the song Spoliarium, one of the album's tracks, is a reference to the Pepsi Paloma rape case. In 2021, Buendia later revealed in an interview that the song is all about a drunken session with the band's roadies in a condominium in San Juan.

References

1997 albums
Eraserheads albums